The following is a list of association football clubs in French Polynesia.

AS Central Sport
AS Dragon
AS Excelsior
AS Fei Pi
AS Maire Nui
AS Manu-Ura
AS Mataiea
AS Mira
AS Papenoo
AS Pirae
AS Pueu
AS Roniu
AS Samine
AS Tamarii Faa'a
AS Tefana
AS Toanui
AS Vaiete
AS Vairao
AS Vénus

French Polynesia
 
Football Clubs
Football Clubs